Methylenedioxyphenylpropanone (C10H10O3) can refer to:

 MDP1P
 MDP2P